Friends & Family, Vol. 2 is a compilation CD of bands who are friends or associated with the crossover band Suicidal Tendencies.

Track listing

Suicidal Tendencies albums
Musicrama, Inc albums
2001 compilation albums